William Terry (April 10, 1942 – March 13, 1999) was a Canadian professional wrestler, known by his ring name Kurt Von Hess, who competed in North American and international promotions during the 1970s and 1980s, including International Wrestling Enterprise, Maple Leaf Wrestling and Stampede Wrestling. A regular tag team partner of Karl Von Schotz, the two were one of the most hated "heels" in the Detroit-area while competing in the National Wrestling Alliance during the early 1970s.

Professional wrestling career
Making his debut in 1966, Terry began wrestling in Pittsburgh for Studio Wrestling and later the World Wide Wrestling Federation. In September 1968, he made his debut in Toronto for promoter Frank Tunney's Maple Leaf Wrestling as "Big" Bill Terry. After a brief stint in World Class Championship Wrestling in late 1968, he later won the Stampede North American Heavyweight Championship defeating Bob Lueck in 1971. After losing the title to Tor Kamata in February 1972, he returned to Ontario.

After John Anson had arrived from Calgary later that year, the two began teaming together as Kurt Von Hess and Karl Von Schotz and soon rose to the top of the tag team division defeating Jacques Rougeau and Gino Brito for the International Tag Team Championship in September 1972. Often headlining events at Maple Leaf Gardens between October 1972 and September 1973, they would also wrestle in Detroit for promoter Ed Farhat defeating Ben Justice and The Stomper for the NWA World Tag Team Championship on December 9, 1972.

Losing the tag team titles to Fred Curry & Tony Marino later that month, they would feud with Curry and Marino for the tag team titles during throughout early 1973 and won the NWA World Tag Team Championship 3 more times from them until losing the titles to Tony Marino and Bobo Brazil in early 1974. Winning the NWF World Tag Team Championship in May, the two would remain tag team champions until the promotions close later that year. While touring New Japan Pro-Wrestling, he and Von Schotz won the NWA North American Tag Team Championship defeating Johnny Powers and Pat Patterson before losing the titles to Antonio Inoki and Seiji Sakaguchi in Los Angeles, California on August 16, 1974.

Splitting up with Anson in 1975, he would remain in Detroit winning the NWA Tag Team Championship once more with Kurt Von Brauner defeating The Islanders (Afa and Sika) in Toledo, Ohio on December 19, 1975.

Losing the tag team titles to Chris Colt and Count Drummer in March 1976, Terry moved on to NWA All-Star Wrestling where he teamed with John Quinn to win the NWA Canadian Tag Team Championship in 1976. He and Quinn also won the IWE World Tag Team Championship defeating Animal Hamaguchi and Isamu Teranishi in Yokohama, Japan on March 25, 1977. The following night at Sumo Hall in Tokyo, he and Quinn lost the titles to Animal Hamaguchi & Isamu Teranishi in a two out of three falls match. Terry would score the first fall pinning Animal Hamaguchi, however he and Von Hess forfeited the second fall via disqualification allowing Hamaguchi to pin Von Hess for the third pinfall.

Terry spent the late 1970s in the southeastern United States feuding with The Wrestling Pro over the NWA Gulf Coast Heavyweight Championship during early 1977 before losing the title to Ken Lucas in Mobile, Alabama on July 26, 1977. In 1978, he and Seigfried Stanke defeated Steven Little Bear & Ray Candy for the NWA Louisiana Tag team Championship before losing the tag team titles to Terry Lathan & Ricky Fields.

Briefly teaming in the Memphis area with King Kong Bundy, Masao Ito, Eddie Gilbert, Phil Hickerson, Randy Collins as well as facing Dutch Mantel and Tojo Yamamoto during the early 1980s, Terry would also continue wrestling in Toronto and, in January 1984, he substituted for Buzz Sawyer in a dog-collar match against Roddy Piper.

Retirement and death
After suffering problems with his kidneys, he was forced to retire in 1986. He would remain on a dialysis machine for six years before an organ donor was available and underwent an operation to receive a new kidney in 1996. Terry would also purchase an Orange Crush distributorship from retired wrestler Wes Hutchins before his death from a heart attack at his west Hamilton home on March 13, 1999.

On July 10, 2017, Terry's wife Cathy died from a heart attack.

Championships and accomplishments
Big Time Wrestling
NWA World Tag Team Championship (Detroit version) (5 times) - with Karl Von Schotz (4) and Kurt Von Brauner (1)
Gulf Coast Championship Wrestling
NWA Gulf Coast Heavyweight Championship (2 times)
International Wrestling Enterprise
IWE World Tag Team Championship (1 time) - with John Quinn
Lutte Internationale
International Tag Team Championship (1 time) - with Karl Von Schotz
National Wrestling Alliance1
NWA North American Tag Team Championship (Los Angeles/Japan version) (1 time) - with Karl Von Schotz
Southwest Sports, Inc. / NWA Big Time Wrestling
NWA Brass Knuckles Championship (Texas version) (1 time)
NWA All-Star Wrestling
NWA Canadian Tag Team Championship (Vancouver version) (1 time) - with John Quinn
NWA Tri-State
NWA Louisiana Tag Team Championship (1 time) - with Seigfried Stanke
NWA Hollywood Wrestling
NWA Americas Tag Team Championship (1 time) with Otto Von Heller
National Wrestling Federation
NWF World Tag Team Championship (2 times) - with Eric the Red and Karl Von Schotz (1)
International Wrestling Association
IWA World Tag Team Championship (1 time) - with Karl Von Stroheim
Stampede Wrestling
Stampede North American Heavyweight Championship (2 times)
Stampede Wrestling Hall of Fame

Notes
1Records aren't clear as to which NWA affiliated promotion they were wrestling in at the time when they held the title.

References

External links

1942 births
1999 deaths
20th-century professional wrestlers
Canadian male professional wrestlers
Faux German professional wrestlers
Professional wrestlers from Hamilton, Ontario
Stampede Wrestling alumni
NWF World Tag Team Champions
WCWA Brass Knuckles Champions
Stampede Wrestling North American Heavyweight Champions
NWA Americas Tag Team Champions
NWA North American Tag Team Champions (Los Angeles/Japan version)